Puthiya Akasam Puthiya Bhoomi is a 1962 Malayalam-language film, directed by M. S. Mani, starring Sathyan and Vinodini. It is based on Thoppil Bhasi's play of the same name that was first staged in 1959. The film received a certificate of merit at the Indian National Film Awards.

Plot

Cast 
Sathyan as Sukumaran
Kottarakkara Sreedharan Nair as Jhonson
Ragini as Ponnamma
B. S. Saroja as Usha
S. P. Pillai as Mammootty
T. S. Muthaiah as Shankarankutty Nair
Kottayam Chellappan as Usha's Father
Bahadoor as Gopakumar
Santo Krishnan as Kunju Nair
Adoor Bhavani
Baby Vinodini
 Gopinath
P. K. Leela

Soundtrack 
The music was composed by M. B. Sreenivasan and lyrics were written by P. Bhaskaran.

Accolades 
National Film Awards
 1962: Certificate of Merit for the Best Feature Film in Malayalam

References

External links 
 

1960s Malayalam-language films
1962 films
Films scored by M. B. Sreenivasan
Indian films based on plays